Bruce Pascoe (born 1947) is an Aboriginal Australian writer of literary fiction, non-fiction, poetry, essays and children's literature. As well as his own name, Pascoe has written under the pen names Murray Gray and Leopold Glass. Since August 2020, he has been Enterprise Professor in Indigenous Agriculture at the University of Melbourne.

Pascoe is best known for his work Dark Emu: Black Seeds: Agriculture or Accident? (2014), in which he argues that traditional Aboriginal and Torres Strait Islander peoples engaged in agriculture, engineering and permanent building construction, and that their practices provide possible models for future sustainable development in Australia.

Early life and education
Pascoe was born in Richmond, Victoria in 1947.  He grew up in a poor working-class family; his father, Alf, was a carpenter, and his mother, Gloria Pascoe, went on to win a gold medal in lawn bowls at the 1980 Arnhem Paralympics.  Pascoe spent his early years on King Island where his father worked at the tungsten mine. His family moved to Mornington, Victoria, when he was 10 years old, and then two years later moved to the Melbourne suburb of Fawkner. He attended the local state school before completing his secondary education at University High School, where his sister had won an academic scholarship. Pascoe went on to attend the University of Melbourne, initially studying commerce but then transferring to Melbourne State College. After graduating with a Bachelor of Education, he was posted to a small township near Shepparton. He later taught at Bairnsdale for nine years.

Career
While on leave from his teaching career, Pascoe bought a  mixed farming property and occasionally worked as an abalone fisherman. In his spare time he began writing short stories, poetry and newspaper articles. 

In 1982 he moved back to Melbourne and sought to publish a journal of short stories. He came into conflict with existing publishers and instead decided to form his own company, raising 10,000 in capital with his friend Lorraine Phelan.  He ran Pascoe Publishing and Seaglass Books with his wife, Lyn Harwood.

From 1982 to 1998 Pascoe edited and published a new quarterly magazine of short fiction, Australian Short Stories, which published all forms of short stories by both established and new writers, including Helen Garner, Gillian Mears and Tim Winton. The first issue came close to selling out its initial print run of 20,000.

The main character in his 1988 novel Fox is a fugitive, searching for his Aboriginal identity and home. The book deals with issues such as Aboriginal deaths in custody, discrimination and land rights, as well as blending Aboriginal traditions with contemporary life and education.

Convincing Ground: Learning to Fall in Love with Your Country (2007), whose title is drawn from the Convincing Ground massacre, examines historical documents and eyewitness accounts of incidents in Australian history and ties them in with the "ongoing debates about identity, dispossession, memory and community". It is described in the publisher's blurb as a book "for all Australians, as an antidote to the great Australian inability to deal respectfully with the nation's constructed Indigenous past".

Pascoe featured in the award-winning documentary series which aired on SBS Television in 2008, First Australians, has been Director of Commonwealth Australian Studies project for the Commonwealth Schools Commission, and has worked extensively on preserving the Wathaurong language, producing a dictionary of the language.

Fog a Dox, a story for young adults, won the Prime Minister's Literary Awards in 2013 and was shortlisted for the 2013 Western Australian Premier's Book Awards (Young Adult category) and the 2013 Deadly Awards (Published Book of the Year category). Judges for the PM's Award commented that "The author's Aboriginality shines through but he wears it lightly...", in a story which incorporates Indigenous cultural knowledge.

Dark Emu (2014) 
Dark Emu: Black Seeds: Agriculture or Accident?, first published in 2014, challenges the claim that pre-colonial Australian Aboriginal peoples were only hunter-gatherers. Pascoe argues that his examination of early settler accounts and other sources provides evidence of agriculture, aquaculture, engineering and villages of permanent housing in traditional Aboriginal societies. The book won Book of the Year at the NSW Premier's Literary Awards, and was widely praised for popularising past research on the sophistication of Aboriginal economies. The book also attracted controversy. A favourable review of its cultural implications in the academic online magazine  The Conversation touched off a debate there about Pascoe's use of his historical sources. A second edition, entitled Dark Emu: Aboriginal Australia and the Birth of Agriculture was published in mid-2018, and a version of the book for younger readers, entitled Young Dark Emu: A Truer History, was published in 2019. The 2019 version was shortlisted for the 2020 Adelaide Festival Awards for Literature in the Children's Literature Award section.

The success of Dark Emu and Young Dark Emu prompted a book-length critique by Sutton and Walshe who argue that Pascoe selectively quotes sources and misinterprets archaeological and anthropological evidence to draw conclusions which give a misleading view of  Aboriginal societies.

In October 2019 it was announced that a documentary film of Dark Emu would be made for television by Blackfella Films, co-written by Pascoe with Jacob Hickey, directed by Erica Glynn and produced by Darren Dale and Belinda Mravicic.

Later work and other roles
In September 2015, in a collaboration with Poets House in New York, a recording of six First Nations Australia Writers Network members reading their work was presented at a special event, which was recorded. Pascoe was one of the readers, along with Jeanine Leane, Dub Leffler, Melissa Lucashenko,  Jared Thomas and Ellen van Neerven.

Pascoe was appointed  Enterprise Professor in Indigenous Agriculture at the University of Melbourne in September 2020, in a role "within the School of Agriculture and Food,... designed to build knowledge and understanding of Indigenous agriculture within the Faculty and to grow engagement and research activities in this area".

Pascoe is a Country Fire Authority volunteer. He battled the 2019–20 bushfires near Mallacoota. In January 2020, he went to New South Wales to help out there, before returning to Mallacoota. He cancelled his scheduled appearances at a Perth Festival event in February and at the Adelaide Writers' Week in March, to remain in East Gippsland to assess the damage done to his Mallacoota property, and to assist his community in the recovery effort in the aftermath of the bushfires.

Aboriginal identity
In his early thirties, Pascoe found Aboriginal ancestors on both sides of his family, including from Tasmania (Palawa), from the Bunurong people of the Kulin nation of Victoria, and the Yuin of southern New South Wales. He identified himself as Koori by the age of 40. He acknowledges his Cornish and European colonial ancestry  but says that he feels Aboriginal, writing, "It doesn’t matter about the colour of your skin, it's about how deeply embedded you are in the culture. It's the pulse of my life". He said that his family denied their own Aboriginality for a long time, and it was only when he investigated the "glaring absences" in the family's story that he was drawn into Aboriginal society and culture.

In Convincing Ground (2007), Pascoe wrote about the dangers of "people of broken and distant heritage like me...barging into their rediscovered community expecting to be greeted like the Prodigal Son", saying that those who have grown up without awareness of their Aboriginality cannot have experienced racism, being removed from family or other disadvantages, and cannot "fully understand what it is to be Aboriginal. You've lost contact with your identity and in quite profound areas it can never be reclaimed." He says that some branches of family trees and public records have often been "pruned of a few branches". In this book and in interviews, Pascoe admits that his Aboriginal ancestry is distant, and that he is "more Cornish than Koori".

Following columnist Andrew Bolt's breach of the Racial Discrimination Act in 2011 relating to comments about fair-skinned Aboriginal people, Pascoe suggested that he and Bolt could "have a yarn" together, without rancour, because "I think it's reasonable for Australia to know if people of pale skin identifying as Aborigines are fair dinkum". He described how and why his Aboriginal ancestry – and that of many others – had been buried, and that the full explanation would be very long and involved.

In December 2019 Indigenous lawyer Josephine Cashman alleged that Pascoe had benefited financially from falsely claiming to be Indigenous. The Australian Federal Police investigated and stated that no Commonwealth offences had been identified.

In January 2020, Pascoe said that he believed that the allegations that he is not Aboriginal are motivated by wanting to discredit Dark Emu. He had already responded to the Boonwurrung Land and Sea Council's rejection of his connection to the Bunurong, saying that his connection was through the Tasmanian family, not through Central Victorian Bunurong. A few days later, the chairman of the Aboriginal Land Council of Tasmania, Michael Mansell, stated that he does not believe that Pascoe has Indigenous ancestry, and he should stop claiming he does. However, Mansell acknowledged that some Indigenous leaders including Marcia Langton and Ken Wyatt supported Pascoe’s Aboriginality based on his claim to community recognition.

In 2021, Nyunggai Warren Mundine, stated that genealogists "have produced research that all Pascoe’s ancestry can be traced to England. Pascoe has not addressed this and has been persistently vague about who his Aboriginal ancestors are and where they came from." Historian Geoffrey Blainey stated that "it is now known that [Pascoe's] four grandparents were of English descent".

Awards
1999: Fellowship of Australian Writers – Australian Literature Award for Shark, joint winner (with David Foster).
2013: Prime Minister's Literary Award – Young Adult Fiction.
2013: Deadly Awards – Published book of the year.
2016: NSW Premier's Literary Award for Dark Emu
2016: New South Wales Premier's Literary Awards – Indigenous Writers' Prize.
2018: Australia Council for the Arts – Lifetime Achievement Award.
2020: Children's Book of the Year Award, Eve Pownall Award for Information Books for Young Dark Emu.
2021: Australian Society of Authors – ASA Medal.

Pascoe was nominated as Person of the Year at the National Dreamtime Awards 2018, and was also invited by Yuin elder Max Dulumunmum Harrison to a special cultural ceremony lasting several days. In the same year he presented "Mother Earth" for the Eric Rolls Memorial Lecture.

Personal life
In 1982, Pascoe separated from a woman whom he had married after graduating from college. They have a daughter. In the same year, he married Lyn Harwood. They have a son. In 2017, Pascoe and Harwood separated. According to Pascoe, the split was due to his many absences and his late-life mission to pursue farming.

Pascoe lives on a  farm near Mallacoota in East Gippsland, on the eastern coast of Victoria. He is also working for his family-run company, Black Duck Foods, that is aiming to produce the type of Indigenous produce mentioned in Dark Emu on a commercial scale.

Works
The following list is a selection of the 182 items by Pascoe as listed on Austlit :

A Corner Full of Characters, Blackstone Press, 1981, 
Night Animals, Penguin Books, 1986, 
Fox, McPhee Gribble/Penguin books, 1988, 
Ruby-eyed Coucal, Magabala Books, 1996, 
Wathaurong : Too bloody strong : Stories and life journeys of people from Wathaurong, Pascoe Publishing, 1997, 
Cape Otway: Coast of secrets (1997) 
Shark, Magabala Books, 1999, 
Nightjar, Seaglass Books, 2000, 
Earth, Magabala Books, 2001, 
Ocean, Bruce Sims Books, 2002, 
Foxies in a Firehose : A piece of doggerel from Warragul, Seaglass Books, 2006, 

The Little Red Yellow Black Book : An introduction to indigenous Australia, Aboriginal Studies Press, 2008, 
Fog a Dox, Magabala Books, 2012, 
Dark Emu: Black Seeds: Agriculture Or Accident?, Magabala Books, 2014, 
Seahorse, Magabala Books, 2015,  
Mrs Whitlam,  Magabala Books, 2016, 
Young Dark Emu: A Truer History, Magabala Books, 2019, 
Salt: Selected Stories and Essays, Black Inc, 2019, 

He has also written under the names Murray Gray (The Great Australian Novel: At Last it's Here, a 1984 satirical novel) and Leopold Glass (Ribcage: All You Need Is $800,000 – Quickly, a 1999 detective novel).

References

Further reading

Pascoe, Bruce. Talk given on 8 July 2000. , Art Gallery of New South Wales, 14 July 2009

1947 births
20th-century Australian male writers
20th-century Australian novelists
20th-century Australian short story writers
21st-century Australian male writers
21st-century Australian non-fiction writers
21st-century Australian novelists
21st-century Australian short story writers
Australian fiction writers
Australian male short story writers
Australian nature writers
Australian publishers (people)
Australian writers of young adult literature
Australian people of Cornish descent
Indigenous Australian academics
Indigenous Australian writers
Living people
People from Richmond, Victoria
Writers from Melbourne
People educated at University High School, Melbourne